Xylophanes gundlachii is a moth of the  family Sphingidae. It is known from Cuba.

It is similar to Xylophanes irrorata. Both the upperside of the body and forewings are deep green, while the hindwings are dark brown.

The larvae probably feed on Rubiaceae and Malvaceae species.

References

gundlachii
Moths described in 1863
Endemic fauna of Cuba